The 1995–96 División de Honor de Fútbol Femenino was the eight edition of Spain's women's football premier league. Nine teams took part in the competition, with Atlético Málaga and CF Llers replacing relegated teams Anaitasuna FT, León FF and FFP Alcobendas.

Añorga KKE won its third title with 11 wins in 16 matches and five points difference over Oroquieta Villaverde. Espanyol, CD Sondika and CE Sabadell followed in the table. Oviedo Moderno-Tradehi was relegated.

Teams and locations

Final table

References

1995-96
Spa
1
women